The Renard mine is a diamond mine in Canada which opened in July 2014. The mine is located in Quebec and is projected to produce 1.5-2 million carats per year. In July 2014, SNC-Lavalin was awarded the EPCM contract for mine related construction management. In December 2016 the operator of the mine, Stornoway Diamond, announced it had achieved commercial production at Renard.

The mine is served by Renard Aerodrome.

References 

Diamond mines in Canada
2014 establishments in Quebec